Henry John Matthews (19 September 1859 – 1909) was a New Zealand nurseryman and forester . He was born in Dunedin, New Zealand on 19 September 1859. He married Grace Annie Gordon on 14 October 1896, in Dunedin.

References

1859 births
1909 deaths
New Zealand foresters
New Zealand horticulturists
Businesspeople from Dunedin
Scientists from Dunedin